The Ministry of Public Works and Housing (lit. Ministry of Public Works and Public Housing), abbreviated Kemen PUPR, is a ministry of the Government of Republic of Indonesia that is responsible for public works and public housing.

The ministry is under the responsibility to the President. Since 27 October 2014, the ministry is led by Basuki Hadimuljono, minister of Public Works and Public Housing.

History

Dutch East Indies period
 
The term "Public Works" is a translation of the Dutch term Openbare Werken which was called Waterstaat swerken during the Dutch East Indies era. The Government Center, built by the Department of Van Verkeer & Waterstaat (Dep.V & W), were led by a director, who oversees several departments (Afdelingen) and services (Diensten) in accordance with the duties / authorities of the Department.

The department also covers the public works (openbare werken) including afdeling Waterstaat, with afdelingen parts: Lands gebouwen, Wegen, Irrigatie and Assainering, Water Kracht, Constructie burreau (for bridges). The department also covers afd. Havenwezen (Harbor), afd. Electriciteitswezen (Electrical) and afd. Luchtvaart (Civil Aviation).

The regulations issued during the Dutch East Indies era for guidelines in carrying out tasks in the Public Works can be read in "A.W.R". 1936 B.W.R 1934 and "W.V.O/W.V.V.".

Japanese Era
 
After the Dutch surrendered in the Pacific war in 1942, to Japan, the Indonesian area was divided by Japan into three administrative regions, namely Java/Madura, Sumatra and East Indonesia and there was no highest Government Center in Indonesia which controlled the government areas.

In the field of public works in each of the areas of the Japanese Military Government organization mentioned above, an organization in the Dutch East Indies era was needed and adjusted to the provisions of the Japanese side. The head office "V & W". in Bandung was renamed Kotubu Bunsitsu (交通 部分 室). Since then, the term  'Pekerjaan Oemoem'  (PO),  'Oeroesan Pekerdjaan Oemoem'  (OPO),  'Pekerjaan Umum'  (PU), and doboku (土木) was commonly used.

Kotubu Bonsitsu in Bandung only has relations with the Government area in Java/Madura, while the relations with outside of Java was not exist. Public Works Organizations in the regions and residents generally stand on their own. There is some work implementation system that uses the system and the name of the Dutch Indies era, other than Japanese system.

Indonesia

After Indonesia proclaimed independence on 17 August 1945, the Indonesian youths began to gradually seize power from the Japanese government, both in the central government (Jakarta / Bandung) and regional governments. After the Indonesian government formed the first Cabinet, the Minister began to formulate its organization and character. Public Works at that time (1945) was based in Bandung, taking the place of the former V. & W building. (known as Gedung Sate).

When the Dutch wanted to restore governmental power in the Dutch East Indies before the war, they came to follow the Allied Forces into Indonesia. As a result of the urges of the Dutch government, there was a physical conflict with the Indonesian Youth who wanted to defend their homeland and the occupied buildings, including the "Gedung Sate" which had become the Public Works Department Building at that time (this historic event is known as the "incident" of 3 December 1945, marked as an anniversary in the Ministry of Public Works).

During the National revolution from 1945 to 1949, the Indonesian Central Government in Jakarta was forced to flee to Purworejo and then to Yogyakarta, as well as the Ministry of Public Works, and later on to Bukitinggi. After the Dutch Government in 1949 recognized the independence of the Republic of Indonesia, the center of the Indonesian government in Yogyakarta was moved again to Jakarta and the Ministry was reformed as the Ministry of Public Works and Energy of the United States of Indonesia.

Since 1945, the Public Works (PU) has often undergone changes in leadership and organization, according to the political situation at that time. In the beginning of the formation of the Unitary Republic of Indonesia, the composition of the Ministries changed due to the changing situation of the times. 

Guided Democracy soon elevated the Ministry of Public Works into prestige as president Sukarno mandated the ministry's work in national construction to build a stronger nation. In the mid 1960s, there was a large Cabinet called the Dwikora Cabinet or the Cabinet of 100 Ministers. The Public Works Ministry also experienced organizational changes in the 60s and in the middle of the decade split into five distinct Ministries under the Dwikora Cabinet led under General Suprajogi, Coordinating Minister for Public Works. These ministries under the Coordinating Ministry were:

 Department of Electricity and Power (Departemen Listrik dan Ketenagaan), for electricity affairs
 Department of Public Highways (Departemen Bina Marga)
 Construction Industry Department (Departemen Cipta Karya Konstruksi)
 Water Department (Departemen Pengairan Dasar)
 Sumatra Highway Department (Departemen Jalan Raya Sumatra)

After the G.30S PKI event, the Government immediately formed the Revised Dwikora Cabinet and among others, appointed Ir Soetami who succeeded Suprajogi as Coordinating Minister for Public Works.

The public works ministry was formed during the Ampera Cabinet, which was the first Cabinet during the New Order era and Ir. Soetami remained in his post. With the Decree of the Minister of PUT dated 17 June 1968 N0.3 / PRT / 1968 and amended by the Ministerial Decree of PUT dated 1 June 1970 Number 4 / PRT / 1970, the department an organizational structure was constructed. As a further illustration of the division of tasks within the public works department, the public work duties at that time was handed and being managed by the regional authorities themselves.

Structure 
On 12 May 2020, the structure of the Ministry was expanded by the Minister of Public Works and Housing Decree No. 13/2021 into:

 Office of the Minister of Public Works and Housing
 Office of the Deputy Minister of Public Works and Housing (Currently in sede vacante)
 Secretariat General
 Office of the Secretary General
 Senior Advisors to the Minister
 Senior Advisor to the Minister on Development Integration
 Senior Advisor to the Minister on Economy and Investment 
 Senior Advisor to the Minister on Sociocultural Affairs and Community Participation
 Senior Advisor to the Minister on Interinstitutional Relations
 Senior Advisor to the Minister on Technology, Industry and Environment
 Special Advisors to the Minister
 Special Advisor to the Minister on Procurement of Goods and Services
 Special Advisor to the Minister on Audit and Construction Supervision
 Special Advisor to the Minister on Water Resources Management
 Special Advisor to the Minister on Housing
 Special Advisor to the Minister on Legal Affairs
 Senior Experts to the Minister
 Senior Expert to the Minister on Community Participation
 Senior Expert to the Minister on Water Resources
 Senior Expert to the Minister on Public Communication 
 Senior Expert to the Minister on Infrastructure Development Strategy
 Senior Expert to the Minister on Environment
 Senior Expert to the Minister on Public Works and Housing Ministerial Complex Landscape Arrangement
 Bureau of Budget Planning and International Cooperation
 Bureau of Personnel, Organization, and Procedure
 Bureau of Financial Affairs
 Bureau of General Affairs
 Bureau of Legal Affairs
 Bureau of State-owned Asset Management
 Bureau of Public Communication
 Center for Policy Implementation Analysis
 Center for Data and Information Technology
 Center for Regional Infrastructure Facilitation
 Directorate General of Water Resources
 Secretariat for Directorate General of Water Resources
 Directorate of Water Resources Management System and Strategy 
 Directorate of River and Coasts
 Directorate of Irrigation and Lowlands
 Directorate of Dams and Lakes
 Directorate of Groundwater and Bulk Water
 Directorate of Operation and Maintenance
 Directorate of Water Resources Engineering Development
 Directorate of Internal Compliance
 Center for Sidoarjo Mud Flow Containment
 National Water Resources Council Secretariat
 River Basin Organizations
 Type "A" Main Stations-level
 River Basin Organization for Sumatera VIII Palembang
 River Basin Organization for Citarum
 River Basin Organization for Cimanuk Cisanggarung
 River Basin Organization for Pemali Juana
 River Basin Organization for Brantas
 River Basin Organization for Pompengan Jeneberang
 River Basin Organization for Serayu Opak
 River Basin Organization for Mesuji Sekampung
 River Basin Organization for Ciliwung Cisadane
 River Basin Organization for Cidanau, Ciujung, Cidurian
 Type "B" Main Stations-level
 River Basin Organization for Citanduy
 Stations-level
 River Basin Organization for  Sumatera I Banda Aceh
 River Basin Organization for Sumatera II Medan
 River Basin Organization for Sumatera III Pekanbaru
 River Basin Organization for Sumatera IV Batam
 River Basin Organization for Bangka Belitung
 River Basin Organization for Sumatera V Padang
 River Basin Organization for Sumatera VI Jambi
 River Basin Organization for Sumatera VII Bengkulu
 River Basin Organization for Kalimantan I Pontianak 
 River Basin Organization for Kalimantan II Palangkaraya 
 River Basin Organization for Kalimantan III Banjarmasin 
 River Basin Organization for Kalimantan IV Samarinda 
 River Basin Organization for Kalimantan V Tanjung Selor 
 River Basin Organization for Sulawesi I Manado 
 River Basin Organization for Sulawesi II Gorontalo 
 River Basin Organization for Sulawesi III Palu 
 River Basin Organization for Sulawesi IV Kendari 
 River Basin Organization for Maluku 
 River Basin Organization for North Maluku 
 River Basin Organization for Bali Penida
 River Basin Organization for Nusa Tenggara I Mataram
 River Basin Organization for Nusa Tenggara II Kupang
 River Basin Organization for Papua 
 River Basin Organization for West Papua 
 River Basin Organization for Merauke
 Technical Implementations Units
 Technical Implementation Unit for Dam Engineering
 Technical Implementation Unit for Coastal Engineering 
 Technical Implementation Unit for Rivers Engineering
 Technical Implementation Unit for Lowlands 
 Technical Implementation Unit for Irrigation 
 Technical Implementation Unit for Sabo Dams 
 Technical Implementation Unit for Hydraulics and Water Geotechnics 
 Technical Implementation Unit for Groundwater 
 Technical Implementation Unit for Hydrology and Water Environment
 Directorate General of Highways 
 Secretariat for Directorate General of Highways
 Directorate of Road and Bridge Management System and Strategy
 Directorate of Road Construction
 Directorate of Bridge Construction
 Directorate of Road and Bridge Preservation for Region I (Sumatera, Kalimantan, Jawa, and Bali Islands)
 Directorate of Road and Bridge Preservation for Region II (Nusa Tenggaras, Sulawesi, All Moluccas, and Papua Islands)\
 Directorate of Freeways
 Directorate of Road and Bridge Engineering Development
 Directorate of Internal Compliance
 Secretariat of National Toll Road Authority
 Provincial National Road Implementation Agencies
 Technical Implementation Units
 Implementation Unit for Road Materials 
 Implementation Unit for Bridges
 Implementation Unit for Geotechnics, Tunnels, and Structures
 Implementation Unit for  Pavement and Road Environment 
 Directorate General of Human Settlements
 Secretariat of Directorate General of Human Settlements
 Directorate of Settlement Infrastructure Implementation System and Strategy
 Directorate of Building Management Development
 Directorate of Water Supply
 Directorate of Settlement Area Development
 Directorate of Sanitation
 Directorate of Strategic Infrastructure
 Directorate for Settlement and Housing Engineering Development
 Directorate of Internal Compliance
 Directorate General of Housing
 Secretariat of Directorate General of Housing
 Directorate of Housing Implementation System and Strategy
 Directorate of Self-Help Housing
 Directorate of Vertical Housing
 Directorate of Specialized Housing
 Directorate of Sanitation
 Directorate of Internal Compliance
 Provincial Settlement Infrastructure Agencies
 Housing Provision Implementation Agencies
 Technical Implementation Units
 Implementation Unit for Water Supply Technology
 Implementation Unit for Sanitation Technology
 Implementation Unit for Building Materials and Structures
 Implementation Unit for Building Science
 Implementation Unit for Settlement and Housing
 Directorate General of Construction Development
 Secretariat of Directorate General of Construction Development
 Directorate of Construction Development
 Directorate of Institutional Affairs and Construction Resources
 Directorate of Construction Competency and Productivity
 Directorate of Construction Services Procurement
 Directorate of Construction Services Procurement
 Construction Services Development Board of Indonesia
 Secretariat of Construction Services Development Board
 Construction Services Agencies 
 Construction Services Agency for Region I Banda Aceh
 Construction Services Agency for Region II Palembang
 Construction Services Agency for Region III Jakarta
 Construction Services Agency for Region IV Surabaya
 Construction Services Agency for Region V Banjarmasin
 Construction Services Agency for Region VI Makassar
 Construction Services Agency for Region VII Jayapura
 Construction Services Procurement Agencies
 Construction Services Procurement Agency for Aceh Region 
 Construction Services Procurement Agency for North Sumatra Region 
 Construction Services Procurement Agency for West Sumatera Region 
 Construction Services Procurement Agency for South Sumatera Region 
 Construction Services Procurement Agency for Jambi Region 
 Construction Services Procurement Agency for Lampung Region 
 Construction Services Procurement Agency for Banten Region 
 Construction Services Procurement Agency for DKI Jakarta Region 
 Construction Services Procurement Agency for West Java Region 
 Construction Services Procurement Agency for D.I Yogyakarta Region 
 Construction Services Procurement Agency for Central Java Region 
 Construction Services Procurement Agency for East Java Region 
 Construction Services Procurement Agency for Bali Region 
 Construction Services Procurement Agency for East Nusa Tenggara Region 
 Construction Services Procurement Agency for West Nusa Tenggara Region 
 Construction Services Procurement Agency for West Kalimantan Region 
 Construction Services Procurement Agency for South Kalimantan Region 
 Construction Services Procurement Agency for Central Kalimantan Region 
 Construction Services Procurement Agency for East Kalimantan Region 
 Construction Services Procurement Agency for North Kalimantan Region 
 Construction Services Procurement Agency for North Sulawesi Region 
 Construction Services Procurement Agency for Southeast Sulawesi Region 
 Construction Services Procurement Agency for Central Sulawesi Region 
 Construction Services Procurement Agency for South Sulawesi Region 
 Construction Services Procurement Agency for Papua Region 
 Construction Services Procurement Agency for West Papua Region
 Construction Services Procurement Agency for Riau Region 
 Construction Services Procurement Agency for Riau Islands Region
 Construction Services Procurement Agency for Bengkulu Region 
 Construction Services Procurement Agency for Bangka Belitung Region
 Construction Services Procurement Agency for Gorontalo Region 
 Construction Services Procurement Agency for West Sulawesi Region 
 Construction Services Procurement Agency for Maluku Region 
 Construction Services Procurement Agency for North Maluku Region
 Directorate General of Public Works and Housing Infrastructure Financing
 Secretary of Directorate General of Public Works and Housing Infrastructure Financing
 Directorate General of Public Works and Housing Infrastructure Financing
 Directorate of Water Resources Infrastructure Financing
 Directorate of Road and Bridge Infrastructure Financing Implementation
 Directorate of Settlement Infrastructure Financing Implementation
 Directorate of Housing Financing Implementation
 Inspectorate General
 Secretariat of Inspectorate General
 Inspectorate I
 Inspectorate II
 Inspectorate III
 Inspectorate IV
 Inspectorate V
 Inspectorate VI
 Regional Infrastructure Development Agency
 Secretariat of Regional Infrastructure Development Agency
 Center for National Infrastructure Development
 Center for Public Works and Housing Infrastructure Development for Region I
 Center for Public Works and Housing Infrastructure Development for Region II
 Center for Public Works and Housing Infrastructure Development for Region III
 Human Resources Development Agency
 Secretariat of Human Resources Development Agency
 Center for Talent Development
 Center for Water Resources and Settlements Competency Development
 Center for Road, Housing and Regional Infrastructure Competency Development
 Center for Management Competency Development
 Public Works Polytechnic
 Public Works and Housing Competency Development Unit for Region I Medan
 Public Works and Housing Competency Development Unit for Region II Palembang
 Public Works and Housing Competency Development Unit for Region III Jakarta
 Public Works and Housing Competency Development Unit for Region IV Bandung
 Public Works and Housing Competency Development Unit for Region V Yogyakarta
 Public Works and Housing Competency Development Unit for Region VI Surabaya
 Public Works and Housing Competency Development Unit for Region VII Banjarmasin
 Public Works and Housing Competency Development Unit for Region VIII Makassar
 Public Works and Housing Competency Development Unit for Region IX Jayapura
 Competency Assessment Unit

References 

Government ministries of Indonesia
Government of Indonesia